Ian Seabrook is a Canadian-British cinematographer, specializing in underwater cinematography. He is known for his underwater and second unit cinematography. Seabrook is also a professional diver.

Career
Seabrook began his career as a stills photographer, photographing underwater in Australia on the Great Barrier Reef. He transitioned to working as an underwater cinematographer in 1998. In 2018, Seabrook photographed underwater sequences for Disney’s Jungle Cruise. In 2020 Seabrook photographed National Geographic Documentary Films’ The Rescue with filmmakers Elizabeth Chai Vasarhelyi and Jimmy Chin. This is a documentary about the 2018 Tham Luang cave rescue, Seabrook recreated the cave-diving team's work in extracting the stranded Thai soccer team.

Seabrook also performed underwater photography for the films Old, Man of Steel and Batman v Superman''.

References 

Year of birth missing (living people)
Living people
British cinematographers
Canadian cinematographers
British male divers
Canadian male divers